The Ranger Way: Living the Code On and Off the Battlefield is a book by former Army Ranger Kris Paronto that was published in 2017. In the book Paranto explains to the readers how to bring "discipline, motivation, success and peace to life".

References

2017 non-fiction books
Self-help books
Center Street (publisher) books